"Taking Somebody with Me When I Fall" is a song written by Larry Gatlin, and recorded by American country music group Larry Gatlin & the Gatlin Brothers Band.  It was released in March 1980 as the third single from the album Straight Ahead.  The song reached number 12 on the Billboard Hot Country Singles & Tracks chart.

Chart performance

References

1980 singles
Larry Gatlin songs
Columbia Records singles
Songs written by Larry Gatlin
1980 songs